Raju Manikrao Karemore is a leader of Nationalist Congress Party and a member of the Maharashtra Legislative Assembly elected from Tumsar Assembly constituency in Bhandara city.

Positions held
 2019: Elected to Maharashtra Legislative Assembly.

References

Living people
Members of the Maharashtra Legislative Assembly
Nationalist Congress Party politicians from Maharashtra
People from Bhandara
Year of birth missing (living people)